Joílson Rodrigues Macedo (born July 7, 1979 in Rio de Janeiro), or simply Joílson, is a Brazilian right back. He is currently Angra dos Reis EC .

Career
Since this announcement São Paulo have now stepped in and signed Joílson for the 2008 season and would be presented to the media on Monday November 19, 2007.

Joílson signed for Tombense in May 2004, his current contract run until 1 January 2013. On 6 May 2009 the 29-year-old defender, leaving the Brazilian soccer champion São Paulo FC and signed with Gremio Porto Alegre.
His contract with Grêmio runs until December 2010.

Joílson moved to Boavista on 12 January 2011 after his contract with Grêmio expired. In May, he joined Figueirense on loan until the end of the 2011 season. After playing just one match for Figueirense, he moved to league rival Atlético Goianiense on 20 July 2011.

Honours
Botafogo
 Campeonato Carioca: 1
 2006

São Paulo
 Brazilian League: 1
 2008

Tombense
 Brazilian League D: 1
 2014

References

External links

1979 births
Living people
Brazilian footballers
America Football Club (RJ) players
Estrela do Norte Futebol Clube players
Cruzeiro Esporte Clube players
Tombense Futebol Clube players
Associação Desportiva Cabofriense players
Botafogo de Futebol e Regatas players
São Paulo FC players
Figueirense FC players
Atlético Clube Goianiense players
Fortaleza Esporte Clube players
Campeonato Brasileiro Série A players
Association football fullbacks
Footballers from Rio de Janeiro (city)